Acidisphaera is a genus in the phylum Pseudomonadota (Bacteria). The genus contains a single species, namely A. rubrifaciens with the following characteristics:
 strictly aerobic, light preferred
 mesophilic
 acidophilic (3.5–6.0 pH, optima of 4.5-5.0)
 bacteriochlorophyll (BChl a) and carotenoids production (salmon-pink colonies), the former contained zinc if grown in the presence of 1 mM zinc sulfate.
 chemo-organotrophic
 Gram-negative, as expected from a proteobacterium
 isolated from acidic hot springs and mine drainage
 non-motile
 cocci / coccobacilli
 Part of the major acidophilic alphaproteobacterial group with the genera Acidiphilium and Rhodopila

Etymology
The name Acidisphaera derives from:New Latin noun acidum (from Latin adjective acidus, sour), an acid; Latin feminine gender noun sphaera, a ball, globe, sphere; New Latin feminine gender noun Acidisphaera, acid (-requiring) coccoid microorganism.
While the specific epithet rubrifaciens comes from the Latin adjective ruber -bra -brum, red; Latin v. facio, to make; New Latin participle adjective rubrifaciens, red-producing.)

See also
 Bacterial taxonomy
 Microbiology

References 

Bacteria genera
Rhodospirillales
Monotypic bacteria genera